Jenny Hutchinson (born 28 September 1974 in London, United Kingdom) is the original actress to play Fizz in the children's show Tweenies. Among her other roles, she has played Meeedea in The Baaas, the joker in Series 1 of Megamaths and Florrie in Fimbles. In addition to acting, she also operates the Second Skin Agency which represents puppeteers, actors/actresses and voicers.

External links
 
 Second Skin Agency
 Jenny Hutchinson's CV

British television actresses
Living people
1974 births